Tímea Babos and Kristina Mladenovic were the defending champions, but chose not to participate this year.

Alexa Guarachi and Desirae Krawczyk won the title, defeating Ellen Perez and Storm Sanders in the final, 6–1, 6–3.

Seeds

Draw

Draw

References

 Main Draw

Istanbul Cup - Doubles
2020 Doubles
2020 in Istanbul
2020 in Turkish tennis